The 1972 Wimbledon Championships was a tennis tournament that took place on the outdoor grass courts at the All England Lawn Tennis and Croquet Club in Wimbledon, London, United Kingdom. The tournament was scheduled to be held from Monday 26 June until Saturday 8 July 1972 but rain on the final Saturday meant that the men's singles, women's doubles and mixed doubles finals were played on Sunday 9 July. It was the first time in the tournament's history that finals were played on a Sunday. It was the 86th staging of the Wimbledon Championships, and the third Grand Slam tennis event of 1972.

Due to the International Lawn Tennis Federation (ILTF) ban on World Championship Tennis (WCT) contract players competing in their tournaments, the reigning men's singles champion John Newcombe was prevented from defending his title. Other players banned from competing included Rod Laver, Ken Rosewall and Arthur Ashe. First-seeded Stan Smith and second-seeded Billie Jean King won the men's and women's singles titles respectively.

Prize money
The total prize money for the 1972 championships was £50,330. The winner of the men's title earned £5,000 while the women's singles champion earned £2,400.

* per team

Champions

Seniors

Men's singles

 Stan Smith defeated  Ilie Năstase, 4–6, 6–3, 6–3, 4–6, 7–5 
It was Smith's 2nd (and last) career Grand Slam title, and his only Wimbledon title.

Women's singles
 
 Billie Jean King defeated  Evonne Goolagong, 6–3, 6–3 
It was King's 8th career Grand Slam title (her 4th in the Open Era), and her 4th Wimbledon title.

Men's doubles

 Bob Hewitt /  Frew McMillan defeated  Stan Smith /  Erik van Dillen, 6–2, 6–2, 9–7

Women's doubles

 Billie Jean King /  Betty Stöve defeated  Françoise Dürr /  Judy Dalton, 6–2, 4–6, 6–3

Mixed doubles

 Ilie Năstase /  Rosie Casals defeated  Kim Warwick /  Evonne Goolagong, 6–4, 6–4

Juniors

Boys' singles

 Björn Borg defeated  Buster Mottram, 6–3, 4–6, 7–5

Girls' singles

 Ilana Kloss defeated  Glynis Coles, 6–4, 4–6, 6–4

Singles seeds

Men's singles
  Stan Smith (champion)
  Ilie Năstase (final, lost to Stan Smith)
  Manuel Orantes (semifinals, lost to Ilie Năstase)
  Andrés Gimeno (second round, lost to Onny Parun)
  Jan Kodeš (semifinals, lost to Stan Smith)
  Pierre Barthès (fourth round, lost to Colin Dibley)
  Bob Hewitt (first round, lost to Jimmy Connors)
  Alex Metreveli (quarterfinals, lost to Stan Smith)

Women's singles
  Evonne Goolagong (final, lost to Billie Jean King)
  Billie Jean King (champion)
  Nancy Richey (quarterfinals, lost to Rosie Casals)
  Chris Evert (semifinals, lost to Evonne Goolagong)
  Kerry Melville (third round, lost to Patti Hogan)
  Rosie Casals (semifinals, lost to Billie Jean King)
  Virginia Wade (quarterfinals, lost to Billie Jean King)
  Françoise Dürr (quarterfinals, lost to Evonne Goolagong)

References

External links
 Official Wimbledon Championships website

 
Wimbledon Championships
Wimbledon Championships
Wimbledon Championships
Wimbledon Championships